The 2017 FIA R-GT Cup was the third edition of the FIA rally cup for GT cars in Group R-GT. The cup was contested over 5 tarmac rounds from the WRC, the ERC and the Rallye International du Valais.

Thanks to the new Fiat 124 R-GT more drivers participated in the R-GT cup than in previous season. The overall winner was Romain Dumas driving a Porsche 997 GT3.

Calendar

The calendar for the 2017 season featured five tarmac rallies: two selected tarmac rounds from the WRC, two selected rounds from the ERC and the 58. Rallye International du Valais from the TER series.

Entries

Results

Notes
  – The Monte Carlo Rally was shortened: the first stage was cancelled after an accident involving Hayden Paddon and a spectator. Overcrowding caused the sixteenth stage to be cancelled for safety reasons.

Standings
Points are awarded to the top ten classified finishers.

Source:

FIA R-GT Cup for Drivers

FIA R-GT Cup for Manufacturers

References

FIA R-GT Cup
R-GT Cup